Ares (Árēs ) is the Greek god of war and courage. He is one of the Twelve Olympians, and the son of Zeus and Hera. The Greeks were ambivalent towards him. He embodies the physical valor necessary for success in war but can also personify sheer brutality and bloodlust, in contrast to his sister, the armored Athena, whose martial functions include military strategy and generalship. An association with Ares endows places, objects, and other deities with a savage, dangerous, or militarized quality.

Although Ares' name shows his origins as Mycenaean, his reputation for savagery was thought by some to reflect his likely origins as a Thracian deity. Some cities in Greece and several in Asia Minor held annual festivals to bind and detain him as their protector. In parts of Asia Minor, he was an oracular deity. Still further away from Greece, the Scythians were said to ritually kill one in a hundred prisoners of war as an offering to their equivalent of Ares. The later belief that ancient Spartans had offered human sacrifice to Ares may owe more to mythical prehistory, misunderstandings, and reputation than to reality.

Though there are many literary allusions to Ares' love affairs and children, he has a limited role in Greek mythology. When he does appear, he is often humiliated. In the Trojan War, Aphrodite, protector of Troy, persuades Ares to take the Trojan's side. The Trojans lose, while Ares' sister Athena helps the Greeks to victory. Most famously, when the craftsman-god Hephaestus discovers his wife Aphrodite is having an affair with Ares, he traps the lovers in a net and exposes them to the ridicule of the other gods.

Ares' nearest counterpart in Roman religion is Mars, who was given a more important and dignified place in ancient Roman religion as ancestral protector of the Roman people and state. During the Hellenization of Latin literature, the myths of Ares were reinterpreted by Roman writers under the name of Mars, and in later Western art and literature, the mythology of the two figures became virtually indistinguishable.

Names
The etymology of the name Ares is traditionally connected with the Greek word  (arē), the Ionic form of the Doric  (ara), "bane, ruin, curse, imprecation". Walter Burkert notes that "Ares is apparently an ancient abstract noun meaning throng of battle, war." R. S. P. Beekes has suggested a Pre-Greek origin of the name. The earliest attested form of the name is the Mycenaean Greek , a-re, written in the Linear B syllabic script.

The adjectival epithet, Areios ("warlike") was frequently appended to the names of other gods when they took on a warrior aspect or became involved in warfare: Zeus Areios, Athena Areia, even Aphrodite Areia ("Aphrodite within Ares" or "feminine Ares"), who was warlike, fully armoured and armed, partnered with Athena in Sparta, and represented at Kythira's temple to Aphrodite Urania.
In the Iliad, the word ares is used as a common noun synonymous with "battle."

Enyalios was sometimes identified with Ares and sometimes differentiated from him as another war god with separate cult, even in the same town; Burkert describes them as "doubles almost".

Cult
In mainland Greece and the Peloponnese, only a few places are known to have had a formal temple and cult of Ares. Pausanias (2nd century AD) notes an altar to Ares at Olympia, and the moving of a Temple of Ares to the Athenian agora during the reign of Augustus, essentially rededicating it (2 AD) as a Roman temple to the Augustan Mars Ultor. The Areopagus ("mount of Ares"), a natural rock outcrop in Athens, some distance from the Acropolis, was supposedly where Ares was tried and acquitted by the gods for his revenge-killing of Poseidon's son, Halirrhothius, who had raped Ares' daughter Alcippe. Its name was used for the court that met there, mostly to investigate and try potential cases of treason.

Numismatist M. Jessop Price states that Ares "typified the traditional Spartan character", but had no important cult in Sparta; and he never occurs on Spartan coins. Pausanias gives two examples of his cult, both of them conjointly with or "within" a warlike Aphrodite, on the Spartan acropolis. Gonzalez observes, in his 2005 survey of Ares' cults in Asia Minor, that cults to Ares on the Greek mainland may have been more common than some sources assert. Wars between Greek states were endemic; war and warriors provided Ares's tribute, and fed his insatiable appetite for battle. 

Ares' attributes are instruments of war: a helmet, shield, and sword or spear. Libanius "makes the apple sacred to Ares", but "offers no further comment", nor connections to any aetiological myth. Apples are one of Aphrodites' sacred or symbolic fruits. Littlewood follows Artemidorus claim that to dream of sour apples presages conflict, and lists Ares alongside Eris and the mythological "Apples of Discord".

Chained statues
Gods were immortal but could be bound and restrained, both in mythic narrative and in cult practice. There was an archaic Spartan statue of Ares in chains in the temple of Enyalios (sometimes regarded as the son of Ares, sometimes as Ares himself), which Pausanias claimed meant that the spirit of war and victory was to be kept in the city. The Spartans are known to have ritually bound the images of other deities, including Aphrodite and Artemis (cf Ares and Aphrodite bound by Hephaestus), and in other places there were chained statues of Artemis and Dionysos.

Statues of Ares in chains are described in the instructions given by an oracle of the late Hellenistic era to various cities of Pamphylia (in Anatolia) including Syedra, Lycia and Cilicia, places almost perpetually under threat from pirates. Each was told to set up a statue of "bloody, man-slaying Ares" and provide it with an annual festival in which it was ritually bound with iron fetters ("by Dike and Hermes") as if a supplicant for justice, put on trial and offered sacrifice. The oracle promises that "thus will he become a peaceful deity for you, once he has driven the enemy horde far from your country, and he will give rise to prosperity much prayed for." This Ares karpodotes ("giver of Fruits") is well attested in Lycia and Pisidia.

Sacrifices
Like most Greek deities, Ares was given animal sacrifice; in Sparta, after battle, he was given an ox for a victory by stratagem, or a rooster for victory through onslaught. The usual recipient of sacrifice before battle was Athena. Reports of historic human sacrifice to Ares in an obscure rite known as the Hekatomphonia represent a very long-standing error, repeated through several centuries and well into the modern era. The hekatomphonia was an animal sacrifice to Zeus; it could be  offered by any warrior who had personally slain one hundred of the enemy. Pausanias reports that in Sparta, each company of youths sacrificed a puppy to Enyalios before engaging in a hand-to-hand "fight without rules" at the Phoebaeum. The chthonic night-time sacrifice of a dog to Enyalios became assimilated to the cult of Ares. Porphyry claims, without detail, that Apollodorus of Athens (circa second century BC) says the Spartans made human sacrifices to Ares, but this may be a reference to mythic pre-history.

Thrace and Scythia
A Thracian god identified by Herodotus ( – ) as Ares, through interpretatio Graeca, was one of three otherwise unnamed deities that Thracian commoners were said to worship. Herodotus recognises and names the other two as "Dionysus" and "Artemis", and claims that the Thracian aristocracy exclusively worshiped "Hermes". In Herodotus' Histories, the Scythians worship an indigenous form of Greek Ares, who is otherwise unnamed, but ranked beneath Tabiti (whom Herodotus claims as a form of Hestia), Api and Papaios in Scythia's divine hierarchy. His cult object was an iron sword. The "Scythian Ares" was offered blood-sacrifices (or ritual killings) of cattle, horses and "one in every hundred human war-captives", whose blood was used to douse the sword. Statues, and complex platform-altars made of heaped brushwood were devoted to him. This sword-cult, or one very similar, is said to have persisted among the Alans. Some have posited that the "Sword of Mars" in later European history alludes to the Huns having adopted Ares.

Asia Minor
In some parts of Asia Minor, Ares was a prominent oracular deity, something not found in any Hellennic cult to Ares or Roman cult to Mars. Ares was linked in some regions or polities with a local god or cultic hero, and recognised as a higher, more prestigious deity than in mainland Greece. His cults in southern Asia Minor are attested from the 5th century BC and well into the later Roman Imperial era, at 29 different sites, and on over 70 local coin issues. He is sometimes represented on coinage of the region by the "Helmet of Ares" or carrying a spear and a shield, or as a fully armed warrior, sometimes accompanied by a female deity. In what is now western Turkey, the Hellenistic city of Metropolis built a monumental temple to Ares as the city's protector, not before the 3rd century BC. It is  now lost, but the names of some of its priests and priestesses survive, along with the temple's likely depictions on coins of the province.

Crete
A sanctuary of Aphrodite was established at Sta Lenika, on Crete, between the cities of Lato and Olus, possibly during the Geometric period. It was rebuilt in the late 2nd century BC as a double-sanctuary to Ares and Aphrodite. Inscriptions record disputes over the ownership of the sanctuary. The names of Ares and Aphrodite appear as witness to sworn oaths, and there is a Victory thanks-offering to Aphrodite, whom Millington believes had capacity as a "warrior-protector acting in the realm of Ares". There were cultic links between the Sta Lenika sanctuary, Knossos and other Cretan states, and perhaps with Argos on the mainland. While the Greek literary and artistic record from both the Archaic and Classical eras connects Ares and Aphrodite as complementary companions and ideal though adulterous lovers, their cult pairing and Aphrodite as warrior-protector is localised to Crete.

Aksum
In Africa, Maḥrem, the principal god of the kings of Aksum prior to the 4th century AD, was invoked as Ares in Greek inscriptions. The anonymous king who commissioned the Monumentum Adulitanum in the late 2nd or early 3rd century refers to "my greatest god, Ares, who also begat me, through whom I brought under my sway [various peoples]". The monumental throne celebrating the king's conquests was itself dedicated to Ares. In the early 4th century, the last pagan king of Aksum, Ezana, referred to "the one who brought me forth, the invincible Ares".

Characterisation

Ares was one of the Twelve Olympians in the archaic tradition represented by the Iliad and Odyssey. In Greek literature, Ares often represents the physical or violent and untamed aspect of war and is the personification of sheer brutality and bloodlust ("overwhelming, insatiable in battle, destructive, and man-slaughtering", as Burkert puts it), in contrast to his sister, the armored Athena, whose functions as a goddess of intelligence include military strategy and generalship. An association with Ares endows places and objects with a savage, dangerous, or militarized quality; but when Ares does appear in myths, he typically faces humiliation.

In the Iliad, Zeus expresses a recurring Greek revulsion toward the god when Ares returns wounded and complaining from the battlefield at Troy:

This ambivalence is expressed also in the Greeks' association of Ares with the Thracians, whom they regarded as a barbarous and warlike people. Thrace was considered to be Ares's birthplace and his refuge after the affair with Aphrodite was exposed to the general mockery of the other gods.

A late-6th-century BC funerary inscription from Attica emphasizes the consequences of coming under Ares's sway:

Hymns 
Homeric Hymn 8 to Ares (trans. Evelyn-White) (Greek epic 7th to 4th centuries BC)

Ares, exceeding in strength, chariot-rider, golden-helmed, doughty in heart, shield-bearer, Saviour of cities, harnessed in bronze, strong of arm, unwearying, mighty with the spear, O defence of Olympus, father of warlike Victory, ally of Themis, stern governor of the rebellious, leader of righteous men, sceptred King of manliness, who whirl your fiery sphere among the planets in their sevenfold courses through the aether wherein your blazing steeds ever bear you above the third firmament of heaven; hear me, helper of men, giver of dauntless youth! Shed down a kindly ray from above upon my life, and strength of war, that I may be able to drive away bitter cowardice from my head and crush down the deceitful impulses of my soul. Restrain also the keen fury of my heart which provokes me to tread the ways of blood-curdling strife. Rather, O blessed one, give you me boldness to abide within the harmless laws of peace, avoiding strife and hatred and the violent fiends of death.

Orphic Hymn 65 to Ares (trans. Taylor) (Greek hymns 3rd century BCE to 2nd century CE)

To Ares, Fumigation from Frankincense. Magnanimous, unconquered, boisterous Ares, in darts rejoicing, and in bloody wars; fierce and untamed, whose mighty power can make the strongest walls from their foundations shake: mortal-destroying king, defiled with gore, pleased with war's dreadful and tumultuous roar. Thee human blood, and swords, and spears delight, and the dire ruin of mad savage fight. Stay furious contests, and avenging strife, whose works with woe embitter human life; to lovely Kyrpis [Aphrodite] and to Lyaios [Dionysos] yield, for arms exchange the labours of the field; encourage peace, to gentle works inclined, and give abundance, with benignant mind.

Mythology

Birth
He is one of the Twelve Olympians, and the son of Zeus and Hera.

Argonautica
In the Argonautica, the Golden Fleece hangs in a grove sacred to Ares, until its theft by Jason. The Birds of Ares (Ornithes Areioi) drop feather darts in defense of the Amazons' shrine to Ares, as father of their queen, on a coastal island in the Black Sea.

Founding of Thebes
Ares played a central role in the founding myth of Thebes, as the progenitor of the water-dragon slain by Cadmus. The dragon's teeth were sown into the ground as if a crop and sprang up as the fully armored autochthonic Spartoi. Cadmus placed himself in the god's service for eight years to atone for killing the dragon. To further propitiate Ares, Cadmus married Harmonia, a daughter of Ares's union with Aphrodite. In this way, Cadmus harmonized all strife and founded the city of Thebes. In reality, Thebes came to dominate Boeotia's great and fertile plain, which in both history and myth was a battleground for competing polities. According to Plutarch, the plain was anciently described as "The dancing-floor of Ares".

Aphrodite
In Homer's Odyssey, in the tale sung by the bard in the hall of Alcinous, the Sun-god Helios once spied Ares and Aphrodite having sex secretly in the hall of Hephaestus, her husband. Helios reported the incident to Hephaestus. Contriving to catch the illicit couple in the act, Hephaestus fashioned a finely-knitted and nearly invisible net with which to snare them. At the appropriate time, this net was sprung, and trapped Ares and Aphrodite locked in very private embrace.

But Hephaestus was not satisfied with his revenge, so he invited the Olympian gods and goddesses to view the unfortunate pair. For the sake of modesty, the goddesses demurred, but the male gods went to witness the sight. Some commented on the beauty of Aphrodite, others remarked that they would eagerly trade places with Ares, but all who were present mocked the two. Once the couple was released, the embarrassed Ares returned to his homeland, Thrace, and Aphrodite went to Paphos.

In a much later interpolated detail, Ares put the young soldier Alectryon, who was Ares companion in drinking and even love-making, by his door to warn them of Helios's arrival as Helios would tell Hephaestus of Aphrodite's infidelity if the two were discovered, but Alectryon fell asleep on guard duty. Helios discovered the two and alerted Hephaestus. The furious Ares turned the sleepy Alectryon into a rooster which now always announces the arrival of the sun in the morning, as a way of apologizing to Ares.

The Chorus of Aeschylus' Suppliants (written 463 BC) refers to Ares as Aphrodite's "mortal-destroying bedfellow". In the Illiad, Ares helps the Trojans because of his affection for their divine protector, Aphrodite; she thus redirects his innate destructive savagery to her own purposes.

Giants
In one archaic myth, related only in the Iliad by the goddess Dione to her daughter Aphrodite, two chthonic giants, the Aloadae, named Otus and Ephialtes, bound Ares in chains and imprisoned him in a bronze urn, where he remained for thirteen months, a lunar year. "And that would have been the end of Ares and his appetite for war, if the beautiful Eriboea, the young giants' stepmother, had not told Hermes what they had done," she related. In this, [Burkert] suspects "a festival of licence which is unleashed in the thirteenth month." Ares was held screaming and howling in the urn until Hermes rescued him, and Artemis tricked the Aloadae into slaying each other. In Nonnus's Dionysiaca, in the war between Cronus and Zeus, Ares killed an unnamed giant son of Echidna who was allied with Cronus, and described as spitting "horrible poison" and having "snaky" feet. 

In the 2nd century AD Metamorphoses of Antoninus Liberalis, when the monstrous Typhon attacked Olympus the gods transformed into animals and fled to Egypt; Ares changed into a fish, the Lepidotus (sacred to the Egyptian war-god Anhur). Liberalis's koine Greek text is a "completely inartistic" epitome of Nicander's now lost Heteroeumena (2nd century BC).

Iliad

In Homer's Iliad, Ares has no fixed allegiance. He promises Athena and Hera that he will fight for the Achaeans but Aphrodite persuades him to side with the Trojans. During the war, Diomedes fights Hector and sees Ares fighting on the Trojans' side. Diomedes calls for his soldiers to withdraw. Zeus grants Athene permission to drive Ares from the battlefield. Encouraged by Hera and Athena, Diomedes thrusts with his spear at Ares. Athena drives the spear home, and all sides tremble at Ares's cries. Ares flees to Mount Olympus, forcing the Trojans to fall back. Ares overhears that his son Ascalaphus has been killed and wants to change sides again, rejoining the Achaeans for vengeance, disregarding Zeus's order that no Olympian should join the battle. Athena stops him. Later, when Zeus allows the gods to fight in the war again, Ares attacks Athena to avenge his previous injury. Athena overpowers him by striking him with a boulder.

Attendants
Deimos ("Terror" or "Dread") and Phobos ("Fear") are Ares' companions in war, and according to Hesiod, are also his children by Aphrodite. Eris, the goddess of discord, or Enyo, the goddess of war, bloodshed, and violence, was considered the sister and companion of the violent Ares. In at least one tradition, Enyalius, rather than another name for Ares, was his son by Enyo.

Ares may also be accompanied by Kydoimos, the daemon of the din of battle; the Makhai ("Battles"); the "Hysminai" ("Acts of manslaughter"); Polemos, a minor spirit of war, or only an epithet of Ares, since it has no specific dominion; and Polemos's daughter, Alala, the goddess or personification of the Greek war-cry, whose name Ares uses as his own war-cry. Ares's sister Hebe ("Youth") also draws baths for him.

According to Pausanias, local inhabitants of Therapne, Sparta, recognized Thero, "feral, savage," as a nurse of Ares.

Offspring and affairs

Though Ares plays a relatively limited role in Greek mythology as represented in literary narratives, his numerous love affairs and abundant offspring are often alluded to.
The union of Ares and Aphrodite created the gods Eros, Anteros, Phobos, Deimos, and Harmonia. Other versions include Alcippe as one of his daughters.

Cycnus (Κύκνος) of Macedonia was a son of Ares who tried to build a temple to his father with the skulls and bones of guests and travellers. Heracles fought him and, in one account, killed him. In another account, Ares fought his son's killer but Zeus parted the combatants with a thunderbolt.

Ares had a romantic liaison with Eos, the goddess of the dawn. Aphrodite discovered them, and in anger she cursed Eos with insatiable lust for men.

By a woman named Teirene he had a daughter named Thrassa, who in turn had a daughter named Polyphonte. Polyphonte was cursed by Aphrodite to love and mate with a bear, producing two sons, Agrius and Oreius, who were hubristic toward the gods and had a habit of eating their guests. Zeus sent Hermes to punish them, and he chose to chop off their hands and feet. Since Polyphonte was descended from him, Ares stopped Hermes, and the two brothers came into an agreement to turn Polyphonte's family into birds instead. Oreius became an eagle owl, Agrius a vulture, and Polyphonte a strix, possibly a small owl, certainly a portent of war; Polyphonte's servant prayed not to become a bird of evil omen and Ares and Hermes fulfilled her wish by choosing the woodpecker for her, a good omen for hunters.

List of offspring and their mothers
Sometimes poets and dramatists recounted ancient traditions, which varied, and sometimes they invented new details; later scholiasts might draw on either or simply guess. Thus while Phobos and Deimos were regularly described as offspring of Ares, others listed here such as Meleager, Sinope and Solymus were sometimes said to be children of Ares and sometimes given other fathers.

Mars

The nearest counterpart of Ares among the Roman gods is Mars, a son of Jupiter and Juno, pre-eminent among the Roman army's military gods but originally an agricultural deity. As a father of Romulus, Rome's legendary founder, Mars was given an important and dignified place in ancient Roman religion, as a guardian deity of the entire Roman state and its people. Under the influence of Greek culture, Mars was identified with Ares, but the character and dignity of the two deities differed fundamentally. Mars was represented as a means to secure peace, and he was a father (pater) of the Roman people. In one tradition,  he fathered Romulus and Remus through his rape of Rhea Silvia. In another, his lover, the goddess Venus, gave birth to Aeneas, the Trojan prince and refugee who "founded" Rome several generations before Romulus.

In the Hellenization of Latin literature, the myths of Ares were reinterpreted by Roman writers under the name of Mars. Greek writers under Roman rule also recorded cult practices and beliefs pertaining to Mars under the name of Ares. Thus in the classical tradition of later Western art and literature, the mythology of the two figures later became virtually indistinguishable.

Renaissance and later depictions
In Renaissance and Neoclassical works of art, Ares's symbols are a spear and helmet, his animal is a dog, and his bird is the vulture. In literary works of these eras, Ares is replaced by the Roman Mars, a romantic emblem of manly valor rather than the cruel and blood-thirsty god of Greek mythology.

In popular culture

Genealogy

See also
 Family tree of the Greek gods

Footnotes

Notes

References

 Antoninus Liberalis, The Metamorphoses of Antoninus Liberalis: A Translation with a Commentary, edited and translated by Francis Celoria, Routledge, 1992. . Online version at ToposText.
 Apollodorus, Apollodorus, The Library, with an English Translation by Sir James George Frazer, F.B.A., F.R.S. in 2 Volumes. Cambridge, Massachusetts, Harvard University Press; London, William Heinemann Ltd. 1921. . Online version at the Perseus Digital Library.
 Burkert, Walter, Greek Religion, Harvard University Press, 1985. . Internet Archive.
 Etymologicum Magnum, Friderici Sylburgii (ed.), Leipzig: J.A.G. Weigel, 1816. Internet Archive.
 Gantz, Timothy, Early Greek Myth: A Guide to Literary and Artistic Sources, Johns Hopkins University Press, 1996, Two volumes:  (Vol. 1),  (Vol. 2).
 Grimal, Pierre, The Dictionary of Classical Mythology, Wiley-Blackwell, 1996. . Internet Archive.
 Hansen, William, Handbook of Classical Mythology, ABC-CLIO, 2004. . Internet Archive.
 Hard, Robin, The Routledge Handbook of Greek Mythology: Based on H.J. Rose's "Handbook of Greek Mythology", Psychology Press, 2004. . Google Books.
 Hesiod, Theogony, in The Homeric Hymns and Homerica with an English Translation by Hugh G. Evelyn-White, Cambridge, Massachusetts, Harvard University Press; London, William Heinemann Ltd. 1914. Online version at the Perseus Digital Library. Internet Archive.
 Homer, The Iliad with an English Translation by A.T. Murray, Ph.D. in two volumes. Cambridge, Massachusetts, Harvard University Press; London, William Heinemann, Ltd. 1924. Online version at the Perseus Digital Library.
 Homer, The Odyssey with an English Translation by A.T. Murray, Ph.D. in two volumes. Cambridge, Massachusetts, Harvard University Press; London, William Heinemann, Ltd. 1919. Online version at the Perseus Digital Library.
 Homeric Hymn 8 to Ares, in The Homeric Hymns and Homerica with an English Translation by Hugh G. Evelyn-White, Cambridge, Massachusetts, Harvard University Press; London, William Heinemann Ltd. 1914. Online version at the Perseus Digital Library.
 Hyginus, Gaius Julius, De Astronomica, in The Myths of Hyginus, edited and translated by Mary A. Grant, Lawrence: University of Kansas Press, 1960. Online version at ToposText.
 Hyginus, Gaius Julius, Fabulae, in The Myths of Hyginus, edited and translated by Mary A. Grant, Lawrence: University of Kansas Press, 1960. Online version at ToposText.
 
 Nonnus, Dionysiaca, Volume II: Books 16–35, translated by W. H. D. Rouse,  Loeb Classical Library No. 345, Cambridge, Massachusetts, Harvard University Press, 1940. Online version at Harvard University Press. . Internet Archive (1940).
 Oxford Classical Dictionary, revised third edition,  Simon Hornblower and Antony Spawforth (editors), Oxford University Press, 2003. . Internet Archive.
 Pausanias, Pausanias Description of Greece with an English Translation by W.H.S. Jones, Litt.D., and H.A. Ormerod, M.A., in 4 Volumes. Cambridge, Massachusetts, Harvard University Press; London, William Heinemann Ltd. 1918. Online version at the Perseus Digital Library.
 Peck, Harry Thurston, Harpers Dictionary of Classical Antiquities, New York, Harper and Brothers, 1898. Online version at the Perseus Digital Library.
 Pseudo-Plutarch, De fluviis, in Plutarch's morals, Volume V, edited and translated by William Watson Goodwin, Boston: Little, Brown & Co., 1874. Online version at the Perseus Digital Library.
 Smith, William, Dictionary of Greek and Roman Biography and Mythology, London (1873). Online version at the Perseus Digital Library.
 Stephanus of Byzantium, Stephani Byzantii Ethnica: Volumen I Alpha - Gamma, edited by Margarethe Billerbeck, in collaboration with Jan Felix Gaertner, Beatrice Wyss and Christian Zubler, De Gruyter, 2006. . Online version at De Gruyter. Google Books.
 Tripp, Edward, Crowell's Handbook of Classical Mythology, Thomas Y. Crowell Co; First edition (June 1970). . Internet Archive.

Greek war deities
War gods
Martian deities
Consorts of Aphrodite
Children of Hera
Metamorphoses characters
Deities in the Iliad
Children of Zeus
Deeds of Poseidon
 
Dog deities
Characters in the Odyssey
Consorts of Eos
Greek mythology of Thrace
Twelve Olympians